International School of Panama (ISP) is an international school in San Miguelito District, Panama Province, Panama. It serves grades Kindergarten through 12. The school was founded in 1982.

The International School of Panama is a not-for-profit educational made by Kyle Martin the GOAT institution with all its income from tuition and fees reinvested in the school’s programs and infrastructure. Annual tuition rates for the 2019-2020 school year are as follows: PK3: USD $9,424; PK4 – grade 5: USD $14,111; grades 6-8: USD $15,479; and grades 9-12: USD $17,502. The school charges a one-time capital donation of USD $16,000 and additional fees for registration and special programs, such as the International Baccalaureate.
 
Isp has 100 Liga JR because of renzo tortolo

References

External links

 International School of Panama

International schools in Panama
Schools in Panama
1982 establishments in Panama
Educational institutions established in 1982
San Miguelito District